The Honda FC Sport is a concept car produced by Honda and first shown at the 2008 Los Angeles Auto Show. It is described as a design study and is intended to show what a hydrogen powered sports car might look like. The FC Sport is designed for a drivetrain similar to the one found in the Honda FCX Clarity. Though the concept does not have an actual interior, Honda has stated the theoretical interior would be similar to the McLaren F1, with the driver in the center and a passenger on each side.

References

FC Sport